Clayton is an unincorporated community and census-designated place in Stevens County, Washington, United States.

Clayton was founded in 1889 and was named for nearby clay deposits. The Washington Brick Company was established in 1893. It, along with most of the town, was lost to a catastrophic fire in 1908, but the town rebuilt, and the new Washington Brick, Lime, and Sewer Pipe company became noted for its high-quality products, including beautiful decorative terra cotta panels, which were crafted largely by skilled artisans who had immigrated to Washington from northern Italy.

Clayton was listed as a census-designated place for the 2010 census and has a population of 443. The median household income is about $32,000. The average annual temperature is about 47 °F, which is approximately 7 °F lower than the average temperature throughout the United States. The average age of residents is 28 years old, 9 years younger than the U.S. average.

Notable residents
It was the birthplace of the Hollywood writer Robert Carson, and the residence of artist Leno Prestini.

References

Unincorporated communities in Stevens County, Washington
Census-designated places in Stevens County, Washington
Unincorporated communities in Washington (state)
Census-designated places in Washington (state)
Populated places established in 1889